This is a list of Methodist denominations (or list of Methodist connexions) including those affiliated with the World Methodist Council, as well as those which are not, the latter of which have been indicated with an asterisk. The denominations' relative sizes are not evident from this list. The list may not be comprehensive, but intends to be an accessible overview of the diversity and global scope of contemporary Methodism.

This list also includes some united and uniting churches with Methodist participation. Some denominations may not have an exclusively Wesleyan heritage.

List

Africa
African Methodist Church, West Africa
African Methodist Church, Zimbabwe
African Methodist Episcopal Church, Central Africa
Bantu Methodist Church of Southern Africa
Nigerian Methodist Church
Kenyan Methodist Church
Methodist Church Ghana
Methodist Church of Southern Africa
Methodist Church in Zimbabwe
Methodist Church in Togo
Protestant Methodist Church in Benin
Protestant Methodist Church in Côte d’Ivoire
United Church in Zambia
United Methodist Church, Central Congo
United Methodist Church in Sierra Leone
United Methodist Church, South Congo

Asia

Church of North India
Church of Pakistan, The
Church of South India, Bangalore Episcopal Area
Free Methodist Church, Japan
Iglesia Evangelica Metodista en las Islas Filipinas 
Korean Methodist Church
Methodist Church in Bangladesh
Methodist Church of Hong Kong
Methodist Church, Republic of China (Taiwan)
Free Methodist Church, Taiwan
Methodist Church in Sichuan, Qing and Republican China
Methodist Church in India
Methodist Church in Indonesia
Methodist Church in Singapore
Methodist Church in Malaysia
Methodist Church, Lower Myanmar
Methodist Church, Upper Myanmar
Methodist Church in Sri Lanka
United Church of Christ in the Philippines
United Church of Christ in Japan

Caribbean
Methodist Church in Cuba
Evangelical Church of the Dominican Republic
Methodist Church in the Caribbean and the Americas
Methodist Church, Bahamas Conference of the (BCMC)
Methodist Church in Puerto Rico
United Church of Canada, Bermuda

Europe

Evangelical Methodist Church in Portugal
Fellowship of Independent Methodist Churches
Independent Methodist Connexion
Methodist Church in Ireland
Methodist Evangelical Church in Italy
Methodist Church of Great Britain
España
Iglesia Evangélica Metodista Libre (España)
Iglesia Evangélica Metodista Unida (España)
Iglesia Evangélica Metodista (España)
Uniting Church in Sweden
United Methodist Church, European regional conferences
Central and Southern Europe Central Conference
United Methodist Church in Austria
United Methodist Church in Bulgaria
United Methodist Church in Hungary
Northern Europe Central Conference of the United Methodist Church
United Methodist Church in Estonia
United Methodist Church in Norway
United Methodist Church in Denmark
United Methodist Church in Latvia
United Methodist Church in Lithuania
United Methodist Church in Germany	
United Methodist Church in Russia
Union of Evangelical Methodist Churches of France
United Protestant Church in Belgium
Wesleyan Reform Union

North America

African Methodist Episcopal Church
African Methodist Episcopal Zion Church
Allegheny Wesleyan Methodist Connection (Wesleyan Methodist Church)*
Association of Independent Methodists*
Bethel Methodist Church*
Bible Methodist Connection of Churches*
Bible Missionary Church
Christian Methodist Episcopal Church
Church of the Nazarene
Congregational Methodist Church*
Emmanuel Association of Churches*
Evangelical Methodist Church of America*
Evangelical Methodist Church*
Evangelical Methodist Church Conference*
Evangelical Wesleyan Church*
First Congregational Methodist Church*
Free Methodist Church, The - North America
Free Methodist Church in Canada
Fundamental Methodist Conference*
Global Methodist Church*
Immanuel Missionary Church*
Liberation Methodist Connexion*
Lumber River Conference of the Holiness Methodist Church*
Methodist Church of Mexico
Methodist Protestant Church*
Missionary Methodist Church*
National Association of Wesleyan Evangelicals*
Pillar of Fire Church*
Primitive Methodist Church*
Southern Congregational Methodist Church*
Southern Methodist Church*
United Church of Canada
United Methodist Church, United States
Wesleyan Church

* = not a part of the World Methodist Council

South America
Evangelical Methodist Church in Argentina
Evangelical Methodist Church in Bolivia
Evangelical Methodist Church in Uruguay
Methodist Church in Chile
Methodist Church in Colombia
Evangelical Methodist Church in Costa Rica
Evangelical United Church, Ecuador
Evangelical Methodist Church in Panama
Evangelical Methodist Community - Paraguay
Methodist Church in Peru

Oceania
Chinese Methodist Church in Australia
Free Wesleyan Church, Tonga
Methodist Church of Fiji and Rotuma
Methodist Church of New Zealand
Uniting Church in Australia

See also

List of Methodist churches - local churches of notability
History of Methodism in the United States
List of Christian denominations

References

External links
Methodist churches — World Council of Churches
World Methodist Council - Worldwide association of Methodist, Wesleyan and related Uniting and United Churches
Member churches - Denominations listed in this article
General Board of Global Ministries - The United Methodist Church

Methodist denominations
Methodist organizations
Methodist